The Ministry of Defense ( abbreviated Kemhan) of the Republic of Indonesia is a government ministry responsible for the defense affairs of Indonesia. The ministry was formerly known as the Department of Defense (abbreviated as Dephan) until 2009 when the nomenclature changed based on Law Number 39 of 2008 dated 6 November 2008 concerning State Ministries, the name of the Department of Defense was changed to the Ministry of Defense of the Republic of Indonesia. The currently-appointed minister is Prabowo Subianto replacing Ryamizard Ryacudu on 23 October 2019.

The Ministry of Defense are one of the three ministries (along with Ministry of Foreign Affairs and Ministry of Home Affairs) explicitly mentioned in the Constitution of Indonesia, which means the three ministries cannot be replaced or dissolved by the President.

If both the President and Vice President of Indonesia were to die, resign, or are unable to perform their duties, the Minister of Defense, along with Minister of Foreign Affairs and Ministry of Home Affairs, jointly execute presidential duties until the succeeding President and Vice President are elected by the People's Consultative Assembly within thirty days.

History

Sukarno Era
After the Proclamation of the Independence of Indonesia on August 17, 1945, the Preparatory Committee for Indonesian Independence (PPKI) immediately set up the first Presidential Cabinet which in the first cabinet didn't have a Minister of Defense. The function of the State Defense at that time was at the Minister of Public Security. On October 6, 1945, Supriyadi was declared Minister of Public Security. However, he never appeared, and on 20 October was replaced by interim minister Imam Muhammad Suliyoadikusumo.

During the time of the First Sjahrir Cabinet, the function of the state defense was also under the authority of the Minister of Public Security, held by Mr. Amir Sjarifoeddin. However, in the Second Sjahrir Cabinet, the People's Security Minister was renamed as the Minister of Defense who still remained in office was Amir Sjarifuddin. At the time of Mr. Amir Sjarifuddin became prime minister, the defense minister is held also by the prime minister. In the period of the First Hatta Cabinet, when the Unitary State of the Republic of Indonesia was in an emergency state due to the pressure of the Dutch forces, the Vice President Mohammad Hatta served as interim minister of defense.

New Order
In the First Development Cabinet, the Minister of Defense and Security was held by the Indonesian President Gen. Soeharto. Only later on the Second Development Cabinet and subsequently, the function of state defense was always united with the security function and was under the Ministry of Defense and Security where the Minister of Defense and Security would if needed serve concurrently as Commander of the Armed Forces (Panglima ABRI) (this was the case four times during Soeharto's presidency). In 1985, as part of a wide reorganization of the armed forces, military appointments to posts of ministers and below began to phased out, allowing retired officers and civilians to serve in the ministry and operational control over the Armed Forces was passed directly to the office of the President.

Reformation
On 1 July 2000, the Ministry of Defense reformed itself with the separation of the TNI and the Polri and also separated the positions in which the Minister of Defense can be of a civilian background, and can no longer concurrently serve as the TNI Commander (Panglima). Regulation through defense is regulated through Law no. 3 of 2002 on State Defense and Law no. 34 of 2004 on the Indonesian National Armed Forces.
Law no. 3 of 2002 on State Defense Article 16 further stipulates the responsibilities of the Minister of Defense, as follows:
Minister leads the Ministry of Defense.
The Minister assists the President in formulating the general policy of state defense.
The Minister shall stipulate a policy on the implementation of state defense based on the general policy set by the President.
The Minister compiles the defense white paper and establishes bilateral, regional and international cooperation policies in its field.
The Minister formulates a general policy of using the power of the Indonesian National Armed Forces (TNI) and other defense components.
The Minister shall determine the policy of budgeting, procurement, recruitment, management of national resources, as well as the development of technology and defense industries required by the Indonesian Armed Forces and other defense force components.
The minister works with the heads of ministries and other government agencies and develops and implements strategic planning for the management of national resources for defense purposes.

Pursuant to Article 18 Paragraph 4, the Commander of the National Armed Forces shall be responsible to the President in the use of the state defense component and cooperate with the Minister in meeting the needs of the Indonesian National Armed Forces.

Naming History 
Previous nomenclatures and their time period were:

 Department of People's Security
 Department of Defense (1946–1962, 1999–2009)
 Department of Defense and Security (1962–1999)

Task and Duties
The Ministry of Defense has the task of organizing defense affairs in the government to assist the President in organizing state administrations. In carrying out its duties, the Ministry of Defense performs the functions of:

Formulation, determination, and implementation of policies in the field of defense
Management of state property which is the responsibility of the Ministry of Defense
Supervision on the implementation of duties within the Ministry of Defense
Implementation of technical activities from central to regional

Organization
The Minister of Defense, by Presidential Decree No. 94/2022, is the head of the Ministry of Defense, the principal assistant to the president in all matters concerning national defense, and has authority and control over the Ministry of Defense. Because the Constitution vests all military authority in the People's Representative Council and the president, the statutory authority in the Minister of Defense is derived from their constitutional authorities. Since it is impractical for the People's Representative Council and the president to participate in every piece of matters relating to national defense, the Minister of Defense, and the Minister's subordinate officials generally exercise national defense authority.

The organizational structure of the Ministry of Defense of the Republic of Indonesia according to Defense Ministerial Regulation No. 14/2019 is as follows:

Leadership elements 

 Minister of Defense; and
 Deputy Minister of Defense

Secretariat 
Secretariat General, headed by a Secretary General, tasked with coordinating duties, organizational management, and providing administrative support for the entire Ministry. The Secretariat General is organized into the following bureaus:
Office of the Secretary General of Defense
Bureau of Planning and Finance
Bureau of Human Resources
Bureau of Legal Affairs
Bureau of Administrative Affairs and Protocols
Bureau of General Affairs
Bureau of Public Relations
Bureau of Organization and Organizational Governance
Bureau of Defense Legislation

Inspectorate 
Inspectorate General, headed by an Inspector General, tasked with internal monitoring within the Ministry. The Inspectorate General headed several subsections, as follows:
Secretariat of the Inspectorate-General;
Inspectorate I, overseeing Defense Planning, Defense Power, Defense Facilities, Education and Training, Strategic Defense Installations, Defense Worthiness, and western representative offices of the Ministry;
Inspectorate II, overseeing the Secretariat General, Defense Strategy, Defense Potential, Research and Development, Data and Information, Defense Finance, the Defense University, and eastern representative offices of the Ministry;
Inspectorate III, overseeing the finances of the Armed Forces Headquarters and the Air Force;
Inspectorate IV, overseeing the finances of the Army; and
Inspectorate V, overseeing the finances of the Navy, the Welfare, Education, and Housing Foundation, and the Armed Forces insurance corporation.

Directorates-General 
Directorate General of Defense Strategy, headed by a Director General, tasked with formulating and implementing Indonesian defense policy in the form of defense strategy of the state. The DG headed several subsections, as follows:
Secretariat of the Directorate General;
Directorate of Strategic Defense Policy;
Directorate of Defense Components Mobilization;
Directorate of Defense International Cooperation; and
Directorate of Regional Defense.
Directorate General of Defense Planning, headed by a Director General, tasked with formulating and implementing Indonesian defense policy in the form of development planning and financial management of state defense. The DG headed several subsections, as follows: 
Secretariat of the Directorate General;
Directorate of Defense Development Planning;
Directorate of Defense Program and Budget Planning;
Directorate of Budget Implementation Administration, and
Directorate of Program and Budget Control.
Directorate General of Defense Potential, headed by a Director General, tasked with formulating and implementing Indonesian defense policy in the form of defense potentials. The DG headed several subsections, as follows: 
Secretariat of the Directorate General;
Directorate of Civic Defense;
Directorate of Defense Resource;
Directorate of Defense Industry and Technology, and
Directorate of Veterans' Affairs.
Directorate General of Defense Power, headed by a Director General, tasked with formulating and implementing Indonesian defense policy in the form of defense power. The DG headed several subsections, as follows: 
Secretariat of the Directorate General;
Directorate of Human Resources;
Directorate of Materials;
Directorate of Facilities and Services, and
Directorate of Health.

Agencies 

 Defense Facilities Agency, headed by a chief, tasked with the management of defense facilities. The Agency headed several subsections, as follows:
 Agency Secretariat;
 Defense Equipment Center;
 Construction Center;
 Codification Center; and
 State Property Center.
 Agency for Defense Policy and Technology Development, headed by a chief, tasked with research and development in defense science and policy. The Agency headed several subsections, as follows:
 Agency Secretariat;
 Defense Strategy Research and Development Center;
 Defense Resource Research and Development Center;
 Defense Science and Technology Research and Development Center; and
 Defense Equipment Research and Development Center.
 Defense Education and Training Agency, headed by a chief, tasked with implementing defense education and training. The Agency headed several subsections, as follows:
 Agency Secretariat;
 Defense Management Education and Training Center;
 Defense Functionary Technical Education and Training Center; and
 Civic Defense Education and Training Center;
 Defense Information and Communication Agency formerly Strategic Defense Installation Agency, headed by a chief, tasked with the management of strategic installations of strategic information system and defense communication system, as well performing cyber defense. The Agency headed several subsections, as follows:
 Agency Secretariat;
 Regional Management Center;
 Cyber Defense Center; and
 Strategic Defense Information Center

Advisors 

 Advisor to the Minister on Political Affairs, advises the Minister on matter of political affairs
 Advisor to the Minister on Economic Affairs, advises the Minister on matter of economic affairs
 Advisor to the Minister on Social Affairs, advises the Minister on matter of social affairs
 Advisor to the Minister on Security Affairs, advises the Minister on matter of security affairs

Centers 

 Defense Worthiness Center, headed by a chief, tasked with providing support for the Ministry and other related agencies on design certification, product worthiness, and quality control and assurances. The Center headed several subsections, as follows:
 Central Administration;
 Indonesian Military Landworthiness Authority;
 Indonesian Military Seaworthiness Authority;
 Indonesian Military Airworthiness Authority; and
 Functionary group
 Defense Data and Information Center, headed by a chief, tasked with providing support for the Ministry and other related agencies on the development and management of defense information system, defense IT and communication infrastructure, defense information and cypher system security, as well as fostering the Ministry's IT and cypher functionaries. The Center headed several subsections, as follows:
 Central Administration;
 Defense Information System Development and Management Section;
 IT and Communications Infrastructure Section;
 Defense Information System and Cypher Security; and
 Functionary group
 Defense Rehabilitation Center, headed by a chief, tasked with providing support for the Ministry and other related agencies on medical rehabilitation, vocational rehabilitation, social rehabilitation, and hospitalization of veterans and wounded personnel of the Armed Forces. The Center headed several subsections, as follows:
 Central Administration;
 Medical Rehabilitation Section;
 Vocational Rehabilitation Section;
 Social Rehabilitation Section; and
 Functionary group
 Defense Financial Monitoring and Management Center, headed by a chief, tasked with providing support for the Ministry and other related agencies on financial management and administration, as well as on defense resource utilization. The Center headed several subsections, as follows:
 Central Administration;
 Accounting and Financial Reporting Section;
 Financial Administration Section;
 Defense Financial Control Section; and
 Functionary group

List of ministers

Seal

See also
 Government of Indonesia
 Indonesian National Armed Forces (TNI)

References

External links
  Ministry of Defense official site

Defense
Indonesia